Edson Joelder Lobo Mucuana (born 12 December 2003) is a Mozambican professional footballer who plays as a midfielder for Vilafranquense.

Club career
Mucuana was included in Vilafranquense's squad for 2021–22 pre-season. However, he would have to wait until the following season to make his professional debut.

International career
Mucuana was called up to the Mozambique under-20 squad for the first time in October 2022. He was called up for the 2023 Africa U-20 Cup of Nations.

Personal life
Mucuana is the son of former professional footballer Paíto.

Career statistics

Club

Notes

References

2003 births
Living people
Mozambican footballers
Mozambique youth international footballers
Association football wingers
Association football midfielders
Liga Portugal 2 players
Imortal D.C. players
C.F. Os Belenenses players
S.C.U. Torreense players
Amora F.C. players
U.D. Vilafranquense players